Evan Bass is an American businessperson, erectile dysfunction specialist and television personality. He has appeared as a contestant on the Reality television shows The Bachelorette and Bachelor in Paradise.  Evan married Carly Waddell in 2017 following their season of Bachelor in Paradise. The couple announced their separation in December 2020.

Career
Bass is the founder and director of several erectile dysfunction clinics in Tennessee. These clinics specialize in education and treatments for male erectile dysfunction, such as pharmaceutical treatment, vacuum therapy, and penile implants. The success of these clinics prompted Bass to co-found the consulting group MMM, LLC, which grants licenses to new erectile dysfunction clinics hoping to copy the success of Tennessee Men's Clinic.  MMM, LLC provides the licensee with guidance on site location, physician recruiting and training, advertising and business materials. MMM, LLC has licensed over 20 erectile dysfunction clinics.

Reality television
Bass appeared as a contestant on the twelfth season of the reality television matchmaking show The Bachelorette, starring Joelle "JoJo" Fletcher. He subsequently appeared on its spin-off show, Bachelor in Paradise, where he became engaged to Carly Waddell, a contestant on season 19 of The Bachelor. Carly and Evan were married on June 17, 2017 in Mexico.

Personal life
Bass has three sons from a previous relationship: Nathan, Liam, and Ensley. On June 17, 2017, Evan and Carly got married in Mexico and in August 2017, announced that they were having a baby girl due in February 2018. On February 15, 2018, they welcomed their daughter Isabella "Bella" Evelyn Bass. In May 2019, they announced that they were expecting another child, a boy, whose gender was revealed on the season finale of the 2019 season of Bachelor in Paradise. On November 12, 2019, they welcomed their son Charles “Charlie” Wolfe Bass.

References

Living people
People from Nashville, Tennessee
Bachelor Nation contestants
1982 births